Ernesto Alarcón Trujillo (born 11 March 1956) is a Mexican politician affiliated with the Institutional Revolutionary Party. He served as Deputy of the LIX Legislature of the Mexican Congress representing Veracruz, and was previously the municipal president of Atzalán from 1995 to 1997.

References

1956 births
Living people
Institutional Revolutionary Party politicians
Municipal presidents in Veracruz
Universidad Veracruzana alumni
Politicians from Veracruz
20th-century Mexican politicians
21st-century Mexican politicians
Deputies of the LIX Legislature of Mexico
Members of the Chamber of Deputies (Mexico) for Veracruz